The American Motor Car Company was a short-lived company in the automotive industry founded in 1906, lasting until 1913. It was based in Indianapolis, Indiana, United States. The American Motor Car Company pioneered the "underslung" design.

History

Harry C. Stutz, who later formed a company bearing his name, designed the first car for the new enterprise. However, Stutz quickly left and Fred L. Tone took over as chief engineer in 1906. Tone re-designed the chassis (frame) below the axles and the semi-elliptic leaf spring suspension system mounted above.

This upside-down or reverse arrangement became known as the underslung design. It gave the vehicles a lower stance and was an industry first. Because of the lower chassis position,  wheels gave the vehicle space between the frame and the ground. The company claimed that the vehicles were safe from rollovers and could be tilted up to 55 degrees.

It was powered by a  engine rated at 40 horsepower (by the measurements at that time), but the car was underpowered. By 1908, the engine was enlarged to  producing . The company entered a large engined roadster in the Savannah Challenge Cup Race held in Savannah, Georgia, but it finished last.

Facing financial problems during 1911, the name was changed to American Motor Company.

In 1912 all of its models featured the distinctive underslung chassis and the cars were officially named American Underslung. However, the new company was still over-extended and inefficient. The relatively small production of its numerous models was divided among three factories.

The company went into bankruptcy in November 1913.

Over an eight-year period, the American Motor Company had produced over 45,000 vehicles.

Like many other automakers during this era, ineffective assembly processes, questionable management practices, as well as a focus on high quality plagued it and expensive models when the market was moving to lower priced utilitarian cars.

References

External links

 
 
 

Motor vehicle manufacturers based in Indiana
Defunct motor vehicle manufacturers of the United States
Defunct companies based in Indianapolis
Manufacturing companies based in Indianapolis
Brass Era vehicles
1900s cars
1910s cars
Vehicle manufacturing companies established in 1906
Vehicle manufacturing companies disestablished in 1913
1906 establishments in Indiana
1913 disestablishments in Indiana
Defunct manufacturing companies based in Indiana